Jasur Jumamurotovich Hasanov (born 24 July 1989) is an Uzbekistani association footballer who currently plays for FC Dinamo Samarqand and the Uzbekistan national team. He plays as a defender.

Career
He signed for FK Buxoro in 2008 and has since gone on to be an integral part of their squad.

International career
Hasanov has represented Uzbekistan at several international levels. He represented Uzbekistan in the 2009 FIFA U-20 World Cup playing against Ghana, England and Uruguay, however Uzbekistan failed to qualify past the group stage. He made his debut for the Senior national team in the upset 1–0 win over Japan in the third round of World Cup qualifying. His first goal for Uzbekistan came during the Fourth Round qualifying against Lebanon in a 1–1 draw.

International goals
Scores and results list Uzbekistan's goal tally first.

References

External links
 Goal.com profile
 FIFA profile
 

1989 births
Living people
People from Bukhara
Uzbekistani footballers
Uzbekistan international footballers
Association football midfielders
Footballers at the 2010 Asian Games
Asian Games competitors for Uzbekistan
Buxoro FK players
PFC Lokomotiv Tashkent players
FC Qizilqum Zarafshon players
FK Neftchi Farg'ona players
PFK Metallurg Bekabad players
FK Dinamo Samarqand players
Uzbekistan Super League players